Belmonte is a municipality (município), in the Brazilian state of Santa Catarina. The name of the mayor is Genesio Bressain. It is located at 26º50'29" S, 53º34'32 W, and as of 2020 it has an estimated population of 2,709 inhabitants.

References

Municipalities in Santa Catarina (state)